Dazed (Dazed & Confused until February 2014) is a bi-monthly British style magazine founded in 1991.  It covers music, fashion, film, art, and literature. Dazed is published by Dazed Media, an independent media group known for producing stories across its print, digital and video brands. The company's portfolio includes titles AnOther, Dazed Beauty and NOWNESS. The company's newest division, Dazed Studio, creates brand campaigns across the luxury and lifestyle sectors. Based in London, its founding editors are Jefferson Hack and fashion photographer Rankin.

Background
Dazed was begun by Jefferson Hack, and Rankin while they were studying at London College of Printing (now London College of Communications). Beginning as a black-and-white folded poster the magazine soon turned full colour and was promoted at London club nights. The Norwegian photographer and later Hells Angel Marcel Leliënhof  was involved with the magazine in the first editions, as was the stylist Katie Grand.

Dazed Digital
Dazeddigital.com launched in November 2006. Its editor is Anna Cafolla.

Dazed Beauty 
In September 2018, Dazed launched Dazed Beauty, a community platform dedicated to redefining the language and communication of beauty.  Its editor-in-chief is Bunney Kinney.

References

External links
 
 The digital edition of Dazed
 Dazed magazine audit

1991 establishments in the United Kingdom
Lifestyle magazines published in the United Kingdom
Bi-monthly magazines published in the United Kingdom
Fashion magazines published in the United Kingdom
Independent magazines
Magazines established in 1991
Magazines published in London